Gwen Thiele (née O'Halloran; 23 March 1918 – 16 November 1979) was an Australian tennis player. She competed in the Australian Open from 1937 to 1965.

She was posthumously inducted into the South Australian Legend's Club in 2019.

She married A.R. Thiele on 30 December 1944.

Grand Slam tournament finals

Doubles (1 runner-up)

Mixed doubles (1 runner-up)

References 

Australian female tennis players
1918 births
1979 deaths
Place of birth missing